"Bubbles" is the fifth single taken from Scottish rock band Biffy Clyro's fifth studio album, Only Revolutions. Josh Homme from Queens of the Stone Age, Kyuss and Them Crooked Vultures provides additional lead guitar in the song. Despite being one of the lower charting songs from the album (reaching #34 on the UK singles chart), it has spent more weeks in the top 100 than any other Biffy Clyro song.

Background and recording

According to the band's official website, the CD single of the song will feature new tracks 'Sad Sad Songs', 'Hiya' and 'Street Love' as b-sides across the formats, CD, 2 x 7" Vinyl and Download. It was added to the BBC Radio 1 A List on 21 April 2010.

In an interview with Kerrang! Simon Neil was quick to praise Josh Homme's guitar skills: "He came to the studio and listened to the song," he said, "and two minutes later, he was playing the best guitar solo you've ever heard." 'Street Love' contains the Chorus of older bootlegs/live versions of single 'That Golden Rule'.

Track listing

CD single 14FLR41X, 5051865731375
"Bubbles" - 5:01
"Sad Sad Songs " - 2:54

7" Blue Vinyl14FLR41, 5051865731276

"Bubbles" - 5:01
"Hiya" - 3:22

7" Green Vinyl14FLR41CD, 5051865731122

"Bubbles" - 5:01
"Street Love" - 2:48

iTunes Digital EP
Bubbles - 5:01
Sad Sad Songs - 2:54
Hiya - 3:22
Street Love - 2:48

Critical performance

When NME commented on Only Revolutions, they said on "Bubbles",

Personnel
Simon Neil: Guitar and Lead vocals:
Ben Johnston: Drum Kit and Backing Vocals
James Johnston: Bass guitar and Backing Vocals

Additional Personnel
Josh Homme: Guitar

Chart performance

After receiving placement on BBC Radio 1's A Playlist, "Bubbles" began to receive increasing amounts of digital downloads throughout April 2010. The single entered the UK Singles Chart at #93 on 25 April 2010. The following week the single climbed 33 places to #60. On 9 May 2010, "Bubbles" climbed into the Top 40 at #40, making it the fifth consecutive single from Only Revolutions to enter the UK Top 40. The following week, the single climbed 6 places to its chart peak of #34, before falling back 6 places to #40 on 23 May 2010.

Year-end charts

Certifications

References

External links
 Biffy Clyro - Only Revolutions NME Review

Biffy Clyro songs
2010 singles
Songs written by Simon Neil
Song recordings produced by Garth Richardson
2009 songs
14th Floor Records singles